Energy supply is the delivery of fuels or transformed fuels to point of consumption. It potentially encompasses the extraction, transmission, generation, distribution and storage of fuels.  It is also sometimes called energy flow.

This supply of energy can be disrupted by several factors, including imposition of higher energy prices due to action by OPEC or other cartel, cum, political disputes, economic disputes, or physical damage to the energy infrastructure due to terrorism.  The security of the energy supply is a major concern of national security and energy law.

Other uses 
Some sources refer to "energy supply" when actually referring to the oil reserves or other potential sources of energy.

New York Consolidated Laws includes a statutory code called "Energy Law".  Article 21 of this code is called "Energy Supply and Production", but rather than a comprehensive code, only consists of one section dealing with renewable energy.

See also

General energy topics 
 Energy
 Energy form
 Energy conservation
 Energy density
 Energy economics
 Energy law
 Energy markets and energy derivatives
 Energy policy
 Energy price
 Energy security
 Energy quality
 Entropy (energy dispersal) and Introduction to entropy
 List of energy topics
 Market transformation
 World energy consumption
 Worldwide energy supply

Renewable and alternative energy sources
 Clean Tech Nation
 Effects of 2000s energy crisis
 Efficient energy use
 Geothermal power
 Global warming
 Intermittent power source
 Ocean energy
 Renewable energy
 Renewable energy commercialization
 Renewable heat
 Vehicle-to-grid
 Wind power

By country
 Japan
 United Kingdom
 United States

References

Other sources
 Lisa Yount, Energy supply: Library in a book (Infobase Publishing, 2005)  Found at Google Books.
 Jon Strand, Energy efficiency and renewable energy supply for the G-7 countries, with emphasis on Germany, Issues 2007–2299, Volumes 7-299 of IMF working paper(International Monetary Fund, 2007) Found at Google Books.
 Herberg, Mikkal (2014). Energy Security and the Asia-Pacific: Course Reader. United States: The National Bureau of Asian Research.
 Ewan McLeish, Challenges to Our Energy Supply: Can the Earth Survive? (The Rosen Publishing Group, 2009)   Found at Google Books.

Fuels